The General Aircraft GAL.45 Owlet was a 1940s British single-engined trainer aircraft built by General Aircraft Limited at London Air Park, Hanworth.

History
The Owlet was a training version of the Cygnet II built as an attempt to produce a cheap primary trainer for the Royal Air Force. The main change was a modified fuselage with a tandem open cockpit (the Cygnet had an enclosed cockpit with side-by-side seating). The same outboard wing panels were used, but due to the slimmer fuselage, the resulting wingspan was reduced by 24 inches (61 cm), and wing area was reduced.

The Owlet prototype (registered G-AGBK) first flew on 5 September 1940. It did not attract any orders, but ironically it was impressed into service (with serial number DP240) with the Royal Air Force as a tricycle undercarriage trainer for the Douglas Boston, which was the primary use to which unmodified Cygnets were also being put.

The only Owlet crashed near Arundel, Sussex on 30 August 1942.

Military operators

 Royal Air Force
 No. 23 Squadron RAF
 No. 605 Squadron RAF

Specifications

See also

Notes

References

 
 

1940s British military trainer aircraft
Single-engined tractor aircraft
Low-wing aircraft
Owlet
Aircraft first flown in 1940